Petropavlovka is a rural locality (a village) in Burikazganovsky Selsoviet, Sterlitamaksky District, Bashkortostan, Russia. The population was 12 as of 2010. There is 1 street.

Geography 
Petropavlovka is located 29 km northwest of Sterlitamak (the district's administrative centre) by road. Sadovka is the nearest rural locality.

References 

Rural localities in Sterlitamaksky District